Bernard John Crowe (28 November 1932 – 9 August 2022) was an Australian rules footballer who played for the Geelong Football Club in the Victorian Football League (VFL).

Notes

External links 

1932 births
2022 deaths
Australian rules footballers from Victoria (Australia)
Geelong Football Club players